Lorna Shore is an American deathcore band formed in New Jersey in 2009. The group currently consists of lead guitarist Adam De Micco, drummer Austin Archey, rhythm guitarist Andrew O'Connor, vocalist Will Ramos, and bassist Michael Yager. The band is most known for their 2021 single "To the Hellfire". They have released four studio albums Psalms (2015), Flesh Coffin (2017), Immortal (2020), and Pain Remains (2022). The band has also released four EPs. Since 2017, no original members remain in the band.

History

Early years, line-up changes, and Psalms (2009–2015)
Lorna Shore was formed during the first quarter of 2009 in New Jersey. The band's first EP entitled Triumph, released in 2010, carried a metalcore sound. The band's second EP Bone Kingdom was the first to carry a deathcore sound, albeit in a more progressive style. Maleficium, the band's third EP, was released in December 2013. The music video for the single "Godmaker" became a hit on YouTube.

Lorna Shore followed the release of Maleficium by opening Carnifex's Die Without Hope Tour featuring I Declare War, Betraying the Martyrs and Here Comes the Kraken. Since then, before releasing their debut album they have toured with acts such as The Black Dahlia Murder, Within the Ruins, Archspire, Oceano, Fallujah, Fit for an Autopsy, Rivers of Nihil, Cattle Decapitation, Upon a Burning Body, The Last Ten Seconds of Life, and Chelsea Grin. Psalms, their debut album was released on June 9, 2015, through Density Records. The album was produced by Fit for an Autopsy guitarist Will Putney at The Machine Shop.

Flesh Coffin and Herrera's departure (2016–2017)
On September 21, 2016, Lorna Shore announced that they had signed with Outerloop Records. The band released their second studio album Flesh Coffin on February 17, 2017. The album was produced by Carson Slovak and Grant McFarland at Atrium Audio, who are known for working alongside bands such as August Burns Red and From Ashes to New, among others. They released a single entitled "Denounce the Light" on November 17, 2016. The second single "Fvneral Moon" was released on January 13, 2017.

In early 2017, bassist and founding member Gary Herrera announced his departure. Flesh Coffin would subsequently be the last release to include the remaining two founding members of the band; Tom Barber on vocals and Gary Herrera on bass.

Departure of Barber and Deffley, McCreery's allegations, and Immortal (2018–2020)
Longtime vocalist Tom Barber confirmed that he had left Lorna Shore in April 2018 to join Chelsea Grin as their vocalist, replacing Alex Koehler, who departed earlier in the year. Lorna Shore issued a statement, assuring their fanbase that they would continue without Barber. CJ McCreery of Pittsburgh-based deathcore band Signs of the Swarm was subsequently announced as his replacement. After McCreery joined Lorna Shore, the band released two singles, titled "This Is Hell" and "Darkest Spawn". The band joined the Summer Slaughter Tour supporting Cattle Decapitation, Carnifex, The Faceless, and several others. In early October, Lorna Shore announced their signing with Century Media Records along with the announcement of their new album, Immortal. The band supported Fit for an Autopsy and Rivers of Nihil from October to November.

On December 23, 2019, the band abruptly fired McCreery after a Weinstein effect-style string of allegations involving alleged sexual abuse occurred in his name.  The allegations began when an ex-lover of McCreery began posting stories and screenshots of text messages detailing abusive-like behavior that allegedly occurred within a 4-year relationship. Following this some other parties also began to accuse McCreery of similar misconduct. A week and a half later, the band announced the cancellation of an upcoming tour in Asia and that their upcoming Immortal album (which was developed with McCreery on vocals) would be delayed. However, these claims were later retracted as it was revealed some time later that the album would be released on the originally planned date of January 31.

...And I Return to Nothingness and Pain Remains (2021–present)

Despite the situation, Lorna Shore went on to tour Europe in support of Immortal, recruiting vocalist Will Ramos (formerly of Monument of a Memory and A Wake in Providence) as a stand-in. All further activity was cut short as a result of the COVID-19 pandemic. On March 5, 2021, while on tour, the band released an instrumental edition of Immortal.

On June 11, 2021, the band returned with a new song titled "To the Hellfire", and announced Ramos as their new permanent vocalist. Ramos was originally a fill-in touring member. They also announced details of their new EP ...And I Return to Nothingness.

"To the Hellfire" became a viral success for the band, peaking at number 4 on the Spotify Viral Chart's Top 10. It was also voted by the readers of Revolver as the "Best Song of 2021 So Far" with writer Eli Enis calling it "one of the most over-the-top heavy deathcore songs in recent memory. It would also go on to overtake "Immortal" as the band's most streamed song on Spotify at over 4 million streams. It was elected by Loudwire as the best metal song of 2021.

The EP was released on August 13, 2021, with positive reviews for the title track. Ricky Aarons writing for Wall of Sound reviewed the EP and title track stating: "The band continue with the epic vehicle of destruction, but change tact slightly, in a way that's reminiscent of their previous work... The technical detail and speed to the riffs are incredible. Once again Ramos doesn't skip a detail in every lyric he sounds... He considers which lines end in a high or low and these minute details are make-or-break. Instead of the song focusing on breakdown ferocity it's more about stead-fast blast beats and the technical element of this wonderful band."

On April 29, 2022, the band debuted a new song, "Sun//Eater", during a concert from their upcoming full length album, titled Pain Remains. The song, along with a music video, was officially released on May 13. As well as the album announcement, the new single was the first to feature new bassist Michael Yager, who joined the band during the recording sessions for Pain Remains. On June 22, Lorna Shore debuted their second single from their upcoming album titled "Into the Earth" with an accompanying music video. On July 26, the band released the third single from the album, "Cursed to Die", and also revealed Pain Remains would be released on October 14. On September 14, the band released the first part of the album's title track titled "Pain Remains I: Dancing Like Flames". On September 29, the band released the second part of the album's title track titled "Pain Remains II: After All I've Done, I'll Disappear" along with a music video. The music video for "Pain Remains III: In a Sea of Fire" was released October 14, 2022, coinciding with the album release.

Musical style
Lorna Shore's musical style has been mainly described as deathcore, blackened death metal, blackened deathcore, and symphonic metal. The band's music contains influences from black metal and utilizes symphonic elements. The band's early work showed one-time experiments in other metal genres outside their primary sound; their debut EP Triumph has been described as metalcore, their second EP Bone Kingdom moved into a progressive deathcore sound, and their debut album Psalms is referred to as more of a technical death metal album with the breakdowns expected in deathcore.

Band members 

Current members
 Adam De Micco – lead guitar (2010–present); rhythm guitar (2011–2015, 2019); bass (2017–2021)
 Austin Archey – drums (2012–present)
 Andrew O'Connor – rhythm guitar  (2019–present); bass (2019–2021)
 Will Ramos – vocals (2021–present; touring member 2020–2021)
 Michael Yager – bass (2021–present); drums (touring member 2022)

Former members
 Aaron Brown – lead guitar (2009–2010)
 Jeff Moskovciak – rhythm guitar (2009–2011)
 Scott Cooper – drums (2009–2012)
 Gary Herrera – bass (2009–2017)
 Tom Barber – vocals (2009–2018)
 Connor Deffley – rhythm guitar (2015–2019); bass (2017–2019)
 CJ McCreery – vocals (2018–2019)

Timeline

Discography 

Studio albums

 Psalms (2015)
 Flesh Coffin (2017)
 Immortal (2020)
 Pain Remains (2022)

References

External links
 
 Lorna Shore at Density Records

2009 establishments in New Jersey
American deathcore musical groups
Century Media Records artists
Heavy metal musical groups from New Jersey
Musical groups established in 2010
Musical groups from New Jersey
Musical quintets
Metalcore musical groups from New Jersey